The 2015 All-SEC football team consists of American football players selected to the All-Southeastern Conference (SEC) chosen by the Associated Press (AP) and the conference coaches for the 2015 Southeastern Conference football season.

The Alabama Crimson Tide won the conference, beating the Florida Gators 29 to 15 in the SEC Championship.

Alabama running back and Heisman Trophy recipient Derrick Henry was unanimously voted the AP SEC Offensive Player of the Year. Alabama linebacker Reggie Ragland was voted the AP SEC Defensive Player of the Year.

Offensive selections

Quarterbacks
 Dak Prescott, Miss. St. (AP-1, Coaches-1, ESPN)
 Chad Kelly, Ole Miss (AP-2, Coaches-2)

Running backs
 Derrick Henry*, Alabama (AP-1, Coaches-1, ESPN)
 Leonard Fournette*, LSU (AP-1, Coaches-1, ESPN)
Alex Collins, Arkansas (AP-2, Coaches-2)
Jalen Hurd, Tennessee (AP-2, Coaches-2)

Wide receivers
Laquon Treadwell, Ole Miss (AP-1, Coaches-1, ESPN)
 Pharoh Cooper, South Carolina (AP-1, Coaches-1, ESPN)
 Fred Ross, Miss. St. (AP-2, Coaches-1)
Calvin Ridley, Alabama (AP-2, Coaches-2)
Drew Morgan, Arkansas (AP-2)
Christian Kirk, Texas A&M (Coaches-2)
De'Runnya Wilson, Miss. St. (Coaches-2)

Centers
Ryan Kelly, Alabama (AP-1, Coaches-1, ESPN)
Brandon Kublanow, Georgia (AP-2)
Ethan Pocic, LSU (Coaches-2)

Guards
Sebastian Tretola, Arkansas (AP-1, Coaches-1, ESPN)
Vadal Alexander, LSU (AP-1, Coaches-1)
Dylan Wiesman, Tennessee (AP-2)
Braden Smith, Auburn (AP-2)

Tackles
Cam Robinson, Alabama (AP-1, Coaches-1)
John Theus, Georgia (AP-1, Coaches-1)
Dan Skipper, Arkansas (AP-2, Coaches-2, ESPN)
Kyler Kerbyson, Tennessee (AP-2, ESPN)
Laremy Tunsil, Ole Miss (ESPN)
Shon Coleman, Auburn (Coaches-2)
Germain Ifedi, Texas A&M (Coaches-2)
Dominick Jackson, Alabama (Coaches-2)

Tight ends
Hunter Henry, Arkansas (AP-1, Coaches-1, ESPN)
Jake McGee, Florida (AP-2)
Evan Engram, Ole Miss (Coaches-2)

Defensive selections

Defensive ends
 Myles Garrett, Texas A&M (AP-1, Coaches-1, ESPN)
 Jonathan Bullard, Florida (AP-1, Coaches-1, ESPN)
Jonathan Allen, Alabama (AP-1, Coaches-1)
Derek Barnett, Tennessee (AP-2, Coaches-2)
Marquis Haynes, Ole Miss (AP-2, Coaches-2)
Charles Harris, Missouri (AP-2, Coaches-2)
Cory Johnson, Kentucky (AP-2)

Defensive tackles 
A'Shawn Robinson, Alabama (AP-1, Coaches-1)
 Robert Nkemdiche, Ole Miss (AP-2, Coaches-2, ESPN)
Jarran Reed, Alabama (AP-2, ESPN)

Linebackers
 Reggie Ragland, Alabama (AP-1, Coaches-1, ESPN)
 Kentrell Brothers, Missouri (AP-1, Coaches-1, ESPN)
Zach Cunningham, Vanderbilt (AP-1, Coaches-1, ESPN)
Antonio Morrison, Florida (AP-2, Coaches-2)
Skai Moore, South Carolina (AP-2, Coaches-2)
Jalen Reeves-Maybin, Tennessee (AP-2)
Leonard Floyd, Georgia (Coaches-2)

Cornerbacks 
 Vernon Hargreaves*, Florida (AP-1, Coaches-1, ESPN)
 Teez Tabor, Florida (AP-1, Coaches-1, ESPN)
Tre'Davious White, LSU (AP-2, Coaches-2)
Mike Hilton, Ole Miss (AP-2, Coaches-2)

Safeties 
Eddie Jackson, Alabama (AP-1, Coaches-1, ESPN)
Dominick Sanders, Georgia (AP-1, Coaches-2)
Trae Elston, Ole Miss (AP-2, Coaches-1, ESPN)
Jamal Adams, LSU (AP-2, Coaches-2)

Special teams

Kickers
Daniel Carlson*, Auburn (AP-1, Coaches-1, ESPN)
Taylor Bertolet, Texas A&M (AP-2, Coaches-2)
Adam Griffith, Alabama (Coaches-2)

Punters
 Drew Kaser, Texas A&M (AP-1, Coaches-1)
Johnny Townsend, Florida (AP-2, Coaches-2, ESPN)

All purpose/return specialist
Christian Kirk, Texas A&M (AP-1, Coaches-2, ESPN)
Evan Berry, Tennessee (AP-2, Coaches-1, ESPN)
Pharoh Cooper, South Carolina (AP-2, Coaches-1)

Key
Bold = Consensus first-team selection by both the coaches and AP

AP = Associated Press

Coaches = Selected by the SEC coaches

ESPN = selected by ESPN.com

* = Unanimous selection of AP

See also
2015 Southeastern Conference football season
2015 College Football All-America Team

References

All-Southeastern Conference
All-SEC football teams